Uklon is a Ukrainian ride-hailing service. Uklon offers ride-hailing, delivery service, carpooling, and other transportation services.

The company was founded as a startup company in 2009, and now has more than 500 employees. The IT division maintains one of the largest infrastructures in the Ukrainian market.

Uklon covers 28 cities in Ukraine. The service has been suspended in two of them, Kherson and Mariupol, since the 2022 Russian invasion of Ukraine.

History

In 2006, Dmytro Dubrovskyi founded Evos. At that time, Evos had about 20 employees, of whom Dmytro Dubrovskyi was the general director, Victoria Dubrovskyi was responsible for finance, and Serhii Smus was responsible for sales. The development of the Uklon product was carried out by a graduate of the Kyiv Mohyla Academy - 21-year-old mathematician Vitaliy Diatlenko. In 2008, Serhii and Vitaliy became co-owners of Evos.
Uklon started operating in 2010.

In 2009, the company emerged based on Evos, which was a typical example of a traditional taxi service in Ukraine. Initially, the idea was to create a new company that would inherit the already existing market of the old one, but the analysis of users' attitudes showed that such an initiative would not have enough support. Instead, an online platform for taxi orders was started – before Uber's beta launch, offering an entirely new type of service to the residents of Ukrainian cities.

Evos and Uklon have been operating as two separate companies since 2015. Uklon rebranded in 2018, with creative agency IAMIDEA creating a new strategy and new ad campaign.
 
In the spring of 2020 deliveries from Uklon began. In April 2022, Uklon resumed business-to-business delivery, which had been suspended since the start of the war in Ukraine. Delivery of B2B orders aims to simplify and automate logistics for retailers.

In October 2021, Uklon became the General Sponsor of Kharkiv FC Metalist.
 
In December 2021, Uklon began operating in Chișinău (Moldova).
 
In May 2022, Uklon launched an international franchising offer, the company also announced that they are open to joint-venture agreements.
 
Among the first target countries are the Baltic States, Poland, Slovakia, and the Czech Republic.

In June 2022, Uklon and the National Police of Ukraine implemented an alert system to search for missing children. Detailed information about the search and photos of the child will be distributed among users of the service in those areas where the child was last seen.

War in Ukraine

Since 2014, Uklon has been supporting the Ukrainian army through the "Back and Alive" foundation. The annual amount of support reaches one million UAH. In 2022, the company tripled monthly support – as of February 2022 it was 310 thousand UAH/month.

In September 2016, users of the Uklon application were able to ride together with volunteers and veterans in the "Military Taxi", which soon went to the Anti-terrorist Operation Zone. Users can order a car by specifying the hashtag #WarTaxi in the comments to the order; the money for the trip was directed to the repair of military equipment.

In March 2022, Uklon launched a new project called "Volunteer", which is designed to transport critical workers like doctors and pharmacists, medicine, food and other supplies. In the same month, Uklon launched a new class of trips, Evacuation. It allows users to find a driver to move between the cities of Ukraine.

In April 2022, Uklon allowed users to make charitable contributions via the application to support the project #UklonVolunteer.

References

Ridesharing companies
Transport companies of Ukraine
Ukrainian companies established in 2010